Frog Jump is an unincorporated community in Crockett County, Tennessee, in the United States.  The community lies along a rural stretch of State Route 88 between Halls to the west and Maury City to the east.  The community's name is believed to be a humorous reference to its small size, namely that it's small enough for a frog to jump over in a single hop.

Notable inhabitants
 Stephen Fincher, a former U.S. congressman, lives in Frog Jump

References

Unincorporated communities in Crockett County, Tennessee
Unincorporated communities in Tennessee